Incorrigible may refer to:
 Incorrigibility
 Incorrigible (1946 film)
 Incorrigible (1975 film)

See also
 The Incorrigible, a 1931 film